Berlin Operations Base (a.k.a. Berlin Operating Base, B.O.B., or BOB), was the headquarters of the CIA (initially OSS) in West Berlin during the Cold War. Established in 1945 by Allen Dulles, it was located on Foehrenweg Street in the suburb of Dahlem in the Zehlendorf District, which had suffered minimal bomb damage during World War II. The building housing BOB was designed by Albert Speer and built in 1936-1940 with air raid protection in mind; accordingly, it had three stories underground.

From 1952 to 1958 the station was run by William Harvey.

References

Bibliography 

Installations of the Central Intelligence Agency
West Berlin
Cold War history of Germany
Albert Speer buildings